Ben Harney (born 29 August 1952 in Brooklyn, New York) is an American actor and dancer who was most active in his career between 1972 and 1985.

Harney attended Manhattan's High School of Music & Art, graduating in 1970.

Harney won the 1982 Tony Award for Best Performance by a Leading Actor in a Musical for his role as the Berry Gordy-esque character, Curtis Taylor Jr. in the Broadway musical Dreamgirls.

He also created, co-wrote and performed in the 1990 children's Christian video series Ben & Eddie with Muppet performer Camille Bonora.

References

External links

1952 births
Living people
American male musical theatre actors
Tony Award winners
African-American male actors
The High School of Music & Art alumni
20th-century African-American male singers
21st-century African-American people